Myrmotherula is a genus of insectivorous passerine birds in the antbird family, Thamnophilidae.

The genus was erected by the English zoologist Philip Sclater in 1858. The type species is the pygmy antwren.

The genus currently contains the following species:

Streaked group: 
 Moustached antwren (Myrmotherula ignota)
 Pygmy antwren (Myrmotherula brachyura)
 Guianan streaked antwren (Myrmotherula surinamensis)
 Amazonian streaked antwren (Myrmotherula multostriata)
 Pacific antwren (Myrmotherula pacifica)
 Cherrie's antwren (Myrmotherula cherriei)
 Klages's antwren (Myrmotherula klagesi)
 Stripe-chested antwren (Myrmotherula longicauda)
 Yellow-throated antwren (Myrmotherula ambigua)
 Sclater's antwren (Myrmotherula sclateri)
Grey group: 
 White-flanked antwren (Myrmotherula axillaris)
 Silvery-flanked antwren (Myrmotherula luctuosa)
 Slaty antwren (Myrmotherula schisticolor)
 Rio Suno antwren (Myrmotherula sunensis)
 Salvadori's antwren (Myrmotherula minor)
 Long-winged antwren (Myrmotherula longipennis)
 Band-tailed antwren (Myrmotherula urosticta)
 Ihering's antwren (Myrmotherula iheringi)
 Rio de Janeiro antwren (Myrmotherula fluminensis)
 Yungas antwren (Myrmotherula grisea)
 Unicolored antwren (Myrmotherula unicolor)
 Alagoas antwren (Myrmotherula snowi)
 Plain-winged antwren (Myrmotherula behni)
 Grey antwren (Myrmotherula menetriesii)
 Leaden antwren (Myrmotherula assimilis)

Several species previously included in this genus as the "stipple-throated group" have now been transferred to a new genus, Epinecrophylla based on a 2006 study of nest architecture, foraging behaviour and vocal repertoire. A molecular genetic study published in 2012 found that the genus was not monophyletic. As a step in creating monophyletic genera, two species that were only distantly related to the other members of Myrmotherula, the rufous-bellied antwren and the plain-throated antwren, were moved to the newly erected genus Isleria. A further study published in 2014 confirmed that the species remaining in Myrmotherula formed a paraphyletic group with respect to the genera Terenura, Formicivora, Stymphalornis and Myrmochanes.

References

 
Bird genera
Taxa named by Philip Sclater
Taxonomy articles created by Polbot